Alan Wolffe (21 June 1959 – 26 May 2001) was an English cell biologist known for his prominent role in establishing that the chromosomal organisation of genes is a dynamic phenomenon determining their expression, cell division and differentiation.

He married Elizabeth and had two children, Max and Katherine.

Wolffe was born on 21 June 1959 in Burton-on-Trent, Staffordshire, England.  He was successful at biology early on, receiving the Biological Council Prize upon leaving secondary school.  He then attended Oxford University, receiving a first class B.A. degree in 1981.  He did his PhD under Prof. Jamshed Tata at the National Institute for Medical Research, London.  He was awarded an EMBO long-term postdoctoral fellowship in 1984 and moved to the laboratory of Donald D. Brown at the Department of Embryology, Carnegie Institution of Washington in Baltimore. He joined the National Institute of Health in 1987, working firstly with Gary Felsenfeld in the Laboratory of Molecular Biology (National Institute of Arthritis, Diabetes and Metabolic Diseases).  In 1990 he was appointed Chief of the newly founded Laboratory of Molecular Embryology (LME).  He left NIH and moved to the biotechnology firm Sangamo BioSciences Inc. in Richmond, California, in 2000, as Senior Vice President and Chief Scientific Officer. He was a prolific writer, publishing hundreds of articles, literature reviews and two books.  He will be known mainly for his work in promoting the idea that chromatin plays a dynamic role in regulating gene expression.

He died as a result of injuries suffered in a road accident in Rio de Janeiro on 26 May 2001.

Sources 

http://jcs.biologists.org/cgi/reprint/114/17/3073.pdf
Chromatin: Structure and Function Alan Wolffe.  
Cell Volume 105, Issue 7, 29 June 2001, Pages 849-850

Cell biologists
1959 births
2001 deaths
20th-century British biologists
21st-century British biologists
British expatriate academics in the United States
People from Burton upon Trent
20th-century English scientists
21st-century English scientists
English biologists
Alumni of the University of Oxford
National Institutes of Health people
English emigrants to the United States